Nebraska Highway 21 is a highway in central Nebraska.  Its southern terminus is at Nebraska Highway 23 east of Eustis.  Its northern terminus is at an intersection with Nebraska Highway 2 and Nebraska Highway 92 in Broken Bow.

Route description
Nebraska Highway 21 begins a mile east of Eustis at an intersection with Nebraska Highway 23.  It goes north through farmland and meets Interstate 80 shortly before Cozad.  In Cozad, it meets U.S. Highway 30 and goes on a  concurrency eastward to Lexington.  At Lexington, it turns north into rural prairie areas and meets Nebraska Highway 40 in Oconto.  After passing Oconto, it turns north-northeasterly and ends in Broken Bow when it meets Nebraska Highway 2 and Nebraska Highway 92.

History
The original version of Nebraska Highway 21 went south from Lexington and turned east to go through Beaver City and Alma.  In the 1940s, U.S. Highway 283 was created and took over the segment of the highway south of Lexington, with the Beaver City-Alma segment becoming Nebraska Highway 89.  In 1960, the current route was completed, as the Cozad-Eustis segment was completed, and the highway extended along US 30.

Major intersections

References

External links

Nebraska Roads: NE 21-40

021
Transportation in Frontier County, Nebraska
Transportation in Dawson County, Nebraska
Transportation in Custer County, Nebraska